Fulk III, the Black ( 987–1040), was an early count of Anjou celebrated as one of the first great builders of medieval castles. It is estimated Fulk constructed approximately 100 castles, along with abbeys throughout the Loire Valley in what is now France. He fought successive wars with neighbors in Brittany, Blois, Poitou and Aquitaine and made four pilgrimages to Jerusalem during the course of his life. He had two wives and three children.

Fulk was a natural horseman and fearsome warrior with a keen sense of military strategy that bested most of his opponents. He was allied with the goals and aims of the Capetians against the dissipated Carolingians of his era. With his county seat at Angers, Fulk's bitter enemy was Odo II of Blois, his neighbor 128 km east along the Loire river, at Tours. The two men traded towns, followers and insults throughout their lives.

Fulk finished his first castle at Langeais, 104 km east of Angers, on the banks of the Loire. Like many of his constructions, it began as a wooden tower, and was eventually replaced with a stone structure, fortified with exterior walls, and equipped with a thick-walled tower called a donjon in French (source of the English dungeon, which, however, implies a cellar, rather than a tower). He built it in the territory of Odo I, Count of Blois, and they fought a battle over it in 994. But Odo I died of a sudden illness, and his son and successor, Odo II, did not manage to evict him.

Fulk continued building more towers in a slow encirclement of Tours: Montbazon, Montrésor, Mirebeau, Montrichard, Loches, and even the tower of Montboyau, erected just across the Loire from Tours in 1016. He also fortified the castles at Angers, Amboise, Chateau-Gontier, Chinon, Mayenne and Semblançay, among many others. "The construction of castles for the purpose of extending a ruler's power was part of Fulk Nerra strategy," wrote Peter Fraser Purton, in A History of Medieval Siege, c. 450–1220.

Fulk was a devout Christian, who built, enlarged or endowed several abbeys and monasteries, such as the Abbey of Beaulieu-lès-Loches, Saint-Florent-le-Vieil, Saint-Aubin, and a convent, Notre Dame de la Charité at Ronceray in Angers. Although he never learned to write, he endowed a school with revenue to provide poor students with an education. Fulk also undertook four pilgrimages to Jerusalem.

Family 
He was the son of Geoffrey I of Anjou, also known as Geoffrey Grisegonelle, and Adele of Meaux, daughter of Robert of Vermandois, Count of Meaux and Troyes, and Adelaide of Burgundy. He had an older sister, Hermengarde (b. 960), who married Conan of Brittany, and a younger brother, Geoffrey. A half-brother, Maurice, was born in 980.

Fulk married Elisabeth of Vendôme (c.979–999), daughter of Count Bouchard of Vendôme, and they had a daughter:
 Adèle, who married Bodon, son of Landry, Count of Nevers. Their eldest son, Bouchard, inherited Vendôme.
Elisabeth's death was recounted in the Chronicles of Saint-Florent: Elisabeth occupied the citadel at Anger with some supporters and while under siege from Fulk, she fell from a great height, and then was burnt at the stake for adultery.

Fulk married Hildegarde of Sundgau, whose family was from Lorraine, around December 1005. They had two children:
Geoffrey II, in 1006, who became known as Geoffrey Martel, succeeded Fulk as Count of Anjou in 1040.
Ermengarde-Blanche, born around 1018.

Combat 
Fulk Nerra's first victory was in June 992 at Battle of Conquereuil, where he managed to defeat Conan I, Duke of Brittany. Conan's territorial ambitions had been quashed by Geoffroy Grisgonelle in 980, and seven years later, he planned an ambush on Angers while Fulk was at the crowning of Robert the Pious. Fulk and his men foiled the ambush, killing Conan's son, Alain, in the process. In 992 Fulk laid siege to Conan's castle at Nantes, but he slipped away to Conquereuil. Conan was killed in the battle, and Fulk installed a governor/regent, as the succeeding count was a child.

While Fulk and Odo II fought many skirmishes over territory and alliances, their biggest battle occurred in July 1016 at the Battle of Pontlevoy. Odo marched 10,000 men southward toward Fulk's tower at Montboyau; meanwhile, Fulk and his much smaller group attacked him from behind. Fulk's men were routed, retreated, and Odo, thinking the battle won, went for a swim in the Cher River. Reinforcements led by Count Herbert Wake-Dog of Maine arrived to help Fulk, fought and routed Odo's surprised men. Several thousand were reported killed.

Pilgrimages 
Fulk also undertook four pilgrimages to Jerusalem—first and second as a penitent seeking forgiveness for sins and third and fourth to protect pilgrims. In 1003, Fulk traveled to Jerusalem for his first pilgrimage. The journey was across the Alps at the Grand Bernard Pass in today's Switzerland, over land to Bari in the southern Italian peninsula (a stop in Rome was usually made), by ship to the Holy Land. The travel took as long as six months, through deeply dangerous territory.

Fulk made a second pilgrimage in 1008, obliged to do so by the king as punishment after Fulk ordered the murder of an enemy. For his third and fourth trips, Fulk had a moral obligation to protect pilgrims in the years following the desecration of Jerusalem by the "Mad Caliph" Al-Hakim bi-Amr Allah, and provided armed security against robbers, murderers and enslavers along the route. In 1035, the third pilgrimage with Robert I, Duke of Normandy and in 1038, he made his final pilgrimage. He died in Metz in 1040 on his return from that trip, and was buried in the chapel of his monastery at Beaulieu.

Succession 
His son Geoffrey II (Geoffrey Martel) succeeded him as Count of Anjou in 1040 and held the title until 1060. Since he had no living male children from either of two marriages, when he died the Anjou title went to his nephews, the two sons of his sister Ermengarde-Blanche (m. Geoffroy V of Château-Landon). Geoffroy III Le Barbu (the Bearded) was Count of Anjou from 1060 to 1068; Fulk IV Réchin (the Mouth) was count from 1068 to 1109. Fulk IV's grandson, Geoffrey Plantagenet, married Matilda, heir to the English throne, and began the House of Plantagenet line of English kings.

Notes

Sources 

970s births
1040 deaths
House of Ingelger
Counts of Anjou
10th-century French people